Jack Toohey may refer to:

 Jack Toohey (footballer) (1925–2010), Australian rules footballer
 Jack Toohey (rugby league), Australian rugby league footballer who played in the 1910s and 1920s